Dorcadion valonense is a species of beetle in the family Cerambycidae. It was described by Pic in 1917. It is known from Albania.

References

valonense
Beetles described in 1917